Kenrick Zondervan (born 28 November 1985) is a Dutch retired basketball player. Standing at 2.06 m (6 ft 9 in), he mainly played as center.

Career
Zondervan played college basketball in the NCAA for the UCF Knights. After that, he played in Greece for Egaleo and for AMSB in France. Zondervan spent five years in the Dutch Basketball League playing for Landstede Basketbal. In September 2016, Zondervan was forced to retire after a shoulder injury.

References

External links
Profile at Eurobasket.com
Dutch Basketball League profile 
UCF profile

1985 births
Living people
Centers (basketball)
Dutch Basketball League players
Dutch men's basketball players
Dutch expatriate basketball people in the United States
Landstede Hammers players
People from Heemstede
UCF Knights men's basketball players
Aix Maurienne Savoie Basket players
Sportspeople from North Holland
Dutch expatriate basketball people in France
Dutch expatriate basketball people in Greece